Liz Maw (born 1966) is an artist from New Zealand.

Background 
Maw was born in 1966 in Wellington, New Zealand. She graduated from the Elam School of Fine Arts in 2002. She lives with her partner, fellow painter Andrew McLeod in Mount Eden.

Career 
Maw is primarily a painter, working in oils. Drawing on her Catholic background, Maw's work melds religious iconography and contemporary issues. She also references European old masters but takes celebrities and modern characters as her subjects, including notable portraits of Francis Upritchard, David Attenborough, and Michael Jackson. Her fantasy figures often depict women and explore the idea of the femme fatale.

Selected exhibitions by Maw include:
 evil genius miscellaneous, 2010 Peter McLeavey Gallery (Wellington)
 What I Did Last Summer, 2011, group show at Peter Mcleavey Gallery (Wellington)
 For Oscar, 2011, group show at Peter Mcleavey Gallery (Wellington)
 New Paintings, 2011, Ivan Anthony Gallery (Auckland)
 The Montgomery Twins Dead End and Avercamp Machine Man Winter Scene, 2012, Peter McLeavey Gallery (Wellington)
 Pandora rides the noon day demon and I feel sorry for you, no, I really do, 2013, Ivan Anthony Gallery (Auckland)
 A Different View: Artists address pornography, 2013, Gus Fisher Gallery, University of Auckland, group exhibition
 summer field, Mary, Jacinda, and an English Artist from a magazine, 2014, Robert Heald Gallery (Wellington)
 Voicing the Visible: feminist art from the University Collection, 2014, Gus Fisher Gallery, University of Auckland, group exhibition 
 Sam and Dani, Debi’s secret and The Future is Not what it used to be, 2016, Robert Heald Gallery (Wellington)
Maw is represented in Auckland by the Ivan Anthony Gallery and in Wellington by the Peter McLeavey Gallery.

Works by Maw are held in several public collections, including at the Auckland Art Gallery Toi o Tāmaki, Chartwell Collection, James Wallace Arts Trust, Museum of New Zealand Te Papa Tongarewa, and the University of Auckland.

References

Further reading 
Artist files for Nicola Farquhar are held at:
 Angela Morton Collection, Takapuna Library 
 Robert and Barbara Stewart Library and Archives, Christchurch Art Gallery Te Puna o Waiwhetu 
 Fine Arts Library | Te Herenga Toi The University of Auckland Libraries and Learning Services 
 E. H. McCormick Research Library, Auckland Art Gallery Toi o Tāmaki 
 Hocken Collections Uare Taoka o Hākena 
 Macmillan Brown Library, University of Canterbury 
 Te Aka Matua Research Library, Museum of New Zealand Te Papa Tongarewa

External links 
 Official website

1966 births
People from Wellington City
People from Mount Eden
Elam Art School alumni
New Zealand painters
New Zealand women painters
People associated with the Museum of New Zealand Te Papa Tongarewa
Living people